Monte Cornagera is a mountain in Lombardy, Italy, within the Bergamo Alps.

Mountains of the Alps
Mountains of Lombardy